Boßdorf (or Bossdorf) is a village and a former municipality in Wittenberg district in Saxony-Anhalt, Germany. Since 1 January 2010, it is part of the town Wittenberg.

Geography
Boßdorf lies about 15 km north of Lutherstadt Wittenberg.

Economy and transportation
Boßdorf is connected to Federal Highway (Bundesstraße) B 2, which lies 6 km east of the community, and joins Berlin and Wittenberg.

Former municipalities in Saxony-Anhalt
Wittenberg